The Central Seberang Perai District (abbreviated: "SPT") is a district in the state of Penang, Malaysia. It covers an area of 238 square kilometres, and had a population of 371,975 at the 2010 Census . The district is bordered by Perai River which separates North Seberang Perai in the north, Junjong River which separates South Seberang Perai in the south, Kedah state border in the east and South Channel which separates Penang Island. Juru River also flows through the district. The capital of this district is Bukit Mertajam. Other localities that are situated in Central Seberang Perai include Permatang Pauh, Penanti, Bukit Tengah, Bukit Minyak, Juru, Alma, Machang Bubok and Permatang Tinggi. The entertainment, eatery and automobile venue of Autocity is also located in this district. Heavy industrial areas cover most parts of Central Seberang Perai.

Administrative divisions 

SPT District is divided into 21 mukims and also consist of 2 towns which are Bukit Mertajam and Perai.

Demographics 

The following is based on Department of Statistics Malaysia 2020 census.

Federal Parliament and State Assembly Seats 
List of Central Seberang Perai district representatives in the Federal Parliament (Dewan Rakyat)

List of Central Seberang Perai district representatives in the State Legislative Assembly of Penang.

See also 

 Districts of Malaysia

References

External links 
 Official Website of Central Seberang Perai Land & District Office
 Official Website of Seberang Perai City Council